North Carolina Highway 242 (NC 242) is a primary state highway in the U.S. state of North Carolina.  It traverses from Cerro Gordo to Benson, connecting the towns of Bladenboro, Elizabethtown, and Roseboro.

Route description

It passes through Columbus, Bladen, Cumberland, Sampson and Johnston Counties. Some major cities, and towns it goes through are Cerro Gordo, Bladenboro, Elizabethtown, Roseboro, Spiveys Corner and Benson.

Although it passes through the southeastern tip of Cumberland County, it never goes near Fayetteville.

History
NC 242 was established in 1930 as a new primary route between NC 24, in Roseboro, and NC 60, in Beamans Crossroads.  In 1937, NC 242 was extended south as new primary routing to US 701/NC 41/NC 53, near Elizabethtown.  In 1940, NC 242 was rerouted at Salemburg north to US 421, its old alignment became Odom Road (SR 1323).  Around 1946, NC 242 was extended southwest as new primary routing to NC 410, in Bladenboro.  In 1948, NC 242 was extended to its current southern terminus at US 76, in Cerro Gordo.  In 1952, NC 242 was extended north to NC 50, in Benson.   In 1988, NC 242 was extended north, through Benson, to its current northern terminus at I-40.

Major intersections

Special routes

Roseboro truck route

North Carolina Highway 242 Truck (NC 242 Truck) is a short  truck route through Roseboro, via Pinewood Street and East Street.

Roseboro alternate spur

North Carolina Highway 242 Alternate (NC 242A) was established in 1939 as a new alternate spur, creating a cutoff between NC 242 and NC 24, in Roseboro.  It is unclear when NC 242A was decommissioned, from its still appearing on Sampson County maps as late as 1968, to links of missing documents located on NCDOT's website, indicated it may have been as late as 1977. Today it is East Roseboro Street.

See also
 North Carolina Bicycle Route 5 - Concurrent with NC 242 from Sweet Home Church Road to Ammon Community Center Road in Bladen County

References

External links

 
 NCRoads.com: N.C. 242

Transportation in Columbus County, North Carolina
Transportation in Bladen County, North Carolina
Transportation in Cumberland County, North Carolina
Transportation in Sampson County, North Carolina
242